Adil Demirbağ (born 10 December 1997) is a Turkish professional footballer who plays as a defender for Süper Lig club Konyaspor.

Professional career
Demirbağ began his career in the lower leagues of Turkey, before joining Konyaspor on 11 September 2019. Demirbağ made his professional debut with Konyaspor in a 0-0 Süper Lig tie with Gençlerbirliği S.K. on 19 September 2020.

References

External links
 
 

1997 births
Living people
People from Elazığ
Turkish footballers
Turkey youth international footballers
Bucaspor footballers
Adana Demirspor footballers
Fatih Karagümrük S.K. footballers
Konyaspor footballers
Süper Lig players
TFF First League players
TFF Second League players
Association football defenders